Google Web Accelerator was a web accelerator produced by Google. It used client software installed on the user's computer, as well as data caching on Google's servers, to speed up page load times by means of data compression, prefetching of content, and sharing cached data between users. The beta, released on May 4, 2005, works with Mozilla Firefox 1.0+ and Internet Explorer 5.5+ on Windows 2000 SP3+, Windows XP, Windows Server 2003, Windows Vista and Windows 7 machines.

Bugs and privacy issues 
It was discovered that Google Web Accelerator had a tendency to prevent YouTube videos from playing, with the message in the YouTube video player, "We're sorry, this video is no longer available." By turning off Google Web Accelerator, the user was able to play YouTube videos again without a problem.

Google Web Accelerator sent requests for web pages, except for secure web pages (HTTPS), to Google, which logged these requests.  Some web pages embedded personal information in these page requests.

Google received and temporarily cached cookie data that your computer sent with webpage requests in order to improve performance.

Google crawled every web page it came across leading it to inadvertently deleting web pages.

In order to speed up delivery of content, Google Web Accelerator sometimes retrieved webpage content that the user did not request, and stored it in the Google Web Accelerator cache. Some law experts and IT authors affirmed that Google would "combine personal and clickstream data with existing search history data contained in Google's own cookie"

Google Web Accelerator is no longer available for, or supported by, Google .  the Google Web Accelerator is not compatible with Firefox 3.0. Google Web Accelerator is still available for download from other websites. The Labs experiment launched in 2005 was discontinued and no longer supported by Google, since January 2009.

Related 
 Google Search
 Opera Turbo

References 

Web Accelerator
Web accelerators